Lechovo, renamed as Iroiko between 1955–1956, is a village and a former community in Florina regional unit, Western Macedonia, Greece. Since the 2011 local government reform it is part of the municipality Amyntaio, of which it is a municipal unit. The municipal unit has an area of 22.844 km2, and a population of 1,115 (2011 census). The village is set amongst the mountains of Northern Greece and the main road runs through the town's centre. There is a museum, a football pitch and an indoor handball stadium. Lechovo has stone architecture common to many northern villages, and has an old upper square and church bell tower.

The village of Lehovo became inhabited in the mid-eighteenth century and some of its villagers worked as master builders. In statistics gathered by Vasil Kanchov in 1900, Lechovo was populated by 750 Christian Albanians and 90 Aromanians. Lechovo, with its population of hellenised Albanians, participated extensively on the Greek side of the Macedonian Struggle in the late Ottoman period. Following the Young Turk Revolution, the Greek clergy's prominent position in places like Lechovo was contested by Aromanian and Albanian nationalists. During the population exchange between Greece and Turkey (1923), Lechovo’s pro-Greek sentiments resulted in Greek authorities removing it from consideration as a resettlement destination in the Florina region for incoming Greek Anatolian refugees.

Lechovo had 1,194 inhabitants in 1981. In fieldwork done by Riki Van Boeschoten in late 1993, Lechovo was populated by Arvanites. Arvanitika (close to Albanian) was spoken in the village by people over 30 in public and private settings. Children understood the language, but mostly did not use it. Aromanian was spoken by people over 60, mainly in private. In the early 2000s, the Tosk Albanian dialect was often spoken by village elders.

Lechovo has not been influenced by the nearby predominant Slavic musical tradition of the area, and villagers have no knowledge of songs from their neighbours. Dances performed in Lechovo are the Berati, Hasapia, Tsamiko, Kalamatiano, along with the Poustseno.

See also
Folklore Museum (Lehovo)

References

Populated places in Florina (regional unit)
Former municipalities in Western Macedonia
Amyntaio
Albanian communities in Greece